Sven-Erik Sundberg (9 November 1934 – 23 August 2017) was a Finnish footballer who played as a midfielder. He made one appearance for the Finland national team in 1957.

References

External links
 

1934 births
2017 deaths
Finnish footballers
Association football midfielders
Finland international footballers
Place of birth missing